16 Greatest Hits is a compilation album by Steppenwolf, released in 1973. It features some of their most famous songs, including "Born to Be Wild", "The Pusher", and "Magic Carpet Ride", and "Hey Lawdy Mama." The album consisted of the 11 tracks from the previous Gold: Their Great Hits album, in the same order as on the two sides of that earlier album, with the addition of the final two tracks on side 1, and the final three tracks on side 2.

This album was originally issued as Dunhill 50135, and later as ABC/Dunhill with the same number, on LP, 8-track cartridge, and cassette.  Following MCA's assimilation of the ABC family of labels, the album was reissued as MCA 1599 (some vinyl copies using previously-pressed LPs with an ABC-Dunhill label), then as budget-label MCA 37049.  The album was made available in all formats through several U. S. record clubs, each bearing notes as to their club origin.  The album was also issued (under various titles) in Canada, England, Germany, Greece, and the Benelux countries, and was issued on CD in 1985.

Track listing 

Note: The version of "Magic Carpet Ride" is not the original single version, but rather, the album version edited down to the length of the single version.

Personnel 
 John Kay – lead vocals, guitar
 Larry Byrom – guitar, backing vocals
 Kent Henry – guitar, backing vocals
 Michael Monarch – guitar, backing vocals
 Goldy McJohn – organ, piano, backing vocals
 Rushton Moreve – bass, backing vocals
 Nick St. Nicholas – bass, backing vocals
 George Biondo – bass, backing vocals
 Jerry Edmonton – drums

Charts 
Album – Billboard (United States)

References

Albums produced by Richard Podolor
Albums produced by Gabriel Mekler
1973 greatest hits albums
Steppenwolf (band) compilation albums
MCA Records compilation albums